David Alejandro Cubillán León (born July 27, 1987) is a Venezuelan professional basketball player. He played college basketball with the Marquette Golden Eagles, where he was a key part of Marquette's bench play.

College career
While at Marquette, Cubillán was the first man off the bench, backing up starting point guard, Dominic James. As a freshman, he scored a career-high 20 points, in a 75–71 win over Pittsburgh, on March 3, 2007.

Professional career
In July 2013, Cubillán signed with Maccabi Haifa of the Israeli Basketball Premier League. However, he was released from the roster that season, and moved to the Israeli club Maccabi Ashdod. He finished that 2013–14 season, playing with his third team of that season, Trotamundos de Carabobo, on the Venezuelan professional league, where he is considered to be one of the best point guards in the league. In August 2017, Cubillan announced that he is going to play in Brazilian league, using the colors of Flamengo.

He later returned to Trotamundos.

National team career
With the senior men's Venezuelan national basketball team, Cubillán has won the gold medal at the 2014 South American Championship, the 2015 FIBA Americas Championship, and the 2016 South American Championship. He also won a silver medal at the 2012 South American Championship.

He also played at the 2016 Summer Olympics.

Player profile
Cubillán's strengths as a player, include his quickness, and his ability to shoot the three-point shot at a high percentage.

References

External links
Twitter
FIBA Profile
FIBA Game Center Profile
EuroCup Profile
Latinbasket.com Profile

1987 births
Living people
Basketball players at the 2015 Pan American Games
Basketball players at the 2016 Summer Olympics
Flamengo basketball players
Fuerza Regia de Monterrey players
Guaiqueríes de Margarita players
Guaros de Lara (basketball) players
Maccabi Ashdod B.C. players
Maccabi Haifa B.C. players
Marquette Golden Eagles men's basketball players
Novo Basquete Brasil players
Olympic basketball players of Venezuela
Pan American Games competitors for Venezuela
Point guards
Soles de Mexicali players
Sportspeople from Maracaibo
Trotamundos B.B.C. players
Venezuelan men's basketball players
Venezuelan expatriate basketball people in Brazil
Venezuelan expatriate basketball people in Israel
Venezuelan expatriate basketball people in Mexico
Venezuelan expatriate basketball people in the United States